Alrick Toney is a Surinamese male badminton player. In 2016, he became the runner-up at the Suriname International tournament in men's doubles event.

Junior and national achievements
In 2009 Alrick Toney reached three finals at the Surinamese national junior championships u-15, winning the boys doubles title. Two years later in 2011 he won the national mixed doubles u-17 title and was runner-up in both singles and boys doubles. The same year he and his older brother Alroy Toney reached the semi-finals of the Men's Doubles event at the seniors National Championships. He also won the u-19 boys singles title at the 5th Boijmans Memorial 2011 an important National Badminton Circuit event for juniors. The next year 2012, he also reached the final of the u-19 Boijmans Memorial event but could not defend his title, being beaten by Soren Opti 19-21, 16-21. In 2012 he was again in three finals at the Surinamese national junior championships, lost the singles final again from Soren Opti, with whom together he won the boys doubles u-19 title. He was also runner-up in the mixed doubles together with partner Crystal Leefmans.
In 2012 he also won the singles u-19 title in French Guiana at the first Suriname - French Guiane inter-club event. At the 2013 Surinamese national junior championships he reached three u-19 finals again, but had to be content with three runners-up spots losing all three finals in singles, doubles and mixed doubles.

Ricky Toney was part of the Surinamese juniors team at many events like the Carebaco Games and also at the 2012 trip of the Juniors squad of Suriname to the Netherlands, where he captured one silver and two bronze medals at the Junior Master Gulicktoernooi 2012.

Achievements

BWF International Challenge/Series
Men's Doubles

 BWF International Challenge tournament
 BWF International Series tournament
 BWF Future Series tournament

References

External links 
 

Living people
Place of birth missing (living people)
Surinamese male badminton players
1995 births